Yoshiro Saeki (September 15, 1871 – June 26, 1965) was a Japanese scholar of religion, law, and the English language. Peter Saeki is his Christian name. He is known for his theories about Nestorianism and Jewish culture in Japan and for his involvement in the planning of the new Hiroshima after the atomic bombing.

Career
Saeki was a Japanese Anglican Christian who became an expert on the influence of the Christian Nestorian sect, which at one time existed in China. He entered Tōkyō Seimon Gakkō (later Waseda University) in 1890. That year he was also baptized into the Anglican-Episcopal Church of Japan at St Paul's Church in Tsukiji, Tokyo, by Rev. Kumanzo Mikami. He was a close friend of Uchimura Kanzō, a Methodist evangelist, but their relationship turned sour later. He graduated in 1893, travelled to the United States, and then moved to Canada to study languages at the University of Toronto, graduating in 1895. He returned to Tōkyō to teach English at Tōkyō Sermon Gakkō and the Tokyo French School. He later taught at the Tokyo Higher Normal School, the Fifth Higher School (Kumamoto), the Tokyo Institute of Technology, and from 1922, at Meiji University. He conducted research in China from 1930 to 1931, and from 1931 to 1940 he was a research associate at Tokyo Imperial University, and he received his doctoral degree from that institution in 1941.

Scholarship

In 1904 he turned his researches towards Chinese history. 1908 he published a book in which he theorised that the Hata clan, which arrived from Korea and settled in Japan in the third century, was a Jewish-Nestorian tribe. According to Ben Ami-Shillony, "Saiki's writings spread the theory about 'the common ancestry of the Japanese and the Jews' (Nichi-Yu dosoron) in Japan, a theory that was endorsed by some Christian groups." Versions of this Japanese-Jewish common ancestry theory were taken up by other writers at the time.

In 1916 he published The Nestorian Monument in China, an analysis of the Nestorian Stele, a monument describing the Chinese Nestorian church in 781 AD. The book summarised the competing theories about the stele. He also published a number of other books and articles on the relics of the Nestorians. His theories of religion were influenced by those of Max Müller.

Hiroshima
After World War II he was appointed mayor of Hatsukaichi, Hiroshima, during which time he consulted on the rebuilding of the city after the atomic bomb blast of August 6, 1945. He advised rebuilding the city as a relatively small and well-planned space.

In 1962 he received an honorary doctorate from Waseda University.

Bibliography 

A partial bibliography of his works as listed in the Library of Congress would include:

 Keikyo hibun kenkyu. The Nestorian monument in China, (Place: Publisher, era 44 [1911]).
 The Nestorian Monument in China, (London: SPCK, 1916, reprinted 1928).
 The luminous religion, a study of Nestorian Christianity in China, with a translation of the inscription upon the Nestorian tablet, with Mrs. C. E. Couling, (London: Carey press, 1925).
 Roma ho koyo, 1927.
 Keikyo no kenkyu, (Tokyo: Toho Bunka Gakuin Tokyo Kenkyujo—Hatsubaijo Bunkyudo Shoten, Showa 10 [1935]; reprinted Tokyo: Meicho Fukyukai, Showa 53 [1978 & 1980].
 Articles in the Journal of the North China Branch of the Royal Asiatic Society from 1932 to 1936.
 Shina Kirisutokyo no kenkyu, (Place: Publisher, Showa 18-24 [1943-49]) 4 vols.
 Nestorian Documents and Relics in China, (Tokyo: Toho bunkwa gakuin: The Academy of oriental culture, 1937; 2nd edition, Tokyo: Maruzen, 1951). An English language abridgement of Keikyo no kenkyu.
 Catalogue of the Nestorian literature and relics, (Tokyo: Maruzen,1950).
 Chūgoku ni okeru Keikyo suibo no rekishi, (Kyoto: Habado Enkei Doshisha Toho Bunka Koza Iinkai, Showa 30 [1955]).
 Roma-teikoku Kirisutokyo hogo kitei no kenkyu. (Place: Publisher, 1957).
 Saeki Yoshiro iko narabini den, (Place: Publisher, Showa 45 [1970]).

Sources

External links
 

1871 births
1965 deaths
Academic staff of Meiji University
Japanese sinologists
Japanese people of World War II
Japanese Anglicans
Writers from Hiroshima
Waseda University alumni
University of Toronto alumni
Academic staff of Tokyo Institute of Technology
University of Tokyo alumni
Mayors of places in Japan
Historians of Christianity
Pseudohistorians